Helge Kjærulff-Schmidt (22 February 1906 – 9 July 1982) was a Danish stage and film actor. He was father to Palle Kjærulff-Schmidt.

Filmography 
Komtessen på Stenholt – 1939

En lille tilfældighed – 1939
Sommerglæder – 1940
En ganske almindelig pige – 1940
Pas på svinget i Solby – 1940
En forbryder – 1941
En mand af betydning – 1941
Far skal giftes – 1941
Tante Cramers testamente – 1941
Tobiasnætter – 1941
Mine kære koner – 1943
Bedstemor går amok – 1944
Lev livet let – 1944
Far betaler – 1946
Op med lille Martha – 1946
Sikken en nat – 1947
Mens porten var lukket – 1948
Den opvakte jomfru – 1950
Dorte – 1951
Fra den gamle købmandsgård – 1951
Hold fingrene fra mor – 1951
Vores fjerde far – 1951
Kærlighedsdoktoren – 1952
Vejrhanen – 1952
Min søn Peter – 1953
Sukceskomponisten – 1954
På tro og love – 1955
Mod og mandshjerte – 1955
Bruden fra Dragstrup – 1955
Tre piger fra Jylland – 1957
Skovridergården – 1957
Andre folks børn – 1958
Det lille hotel – 1958
Styrmand Karlsen – 1958
Ballade på Bullerborg – 1959
Paw – 1959
De sjove år – 1959
Gymnasiepigen – 1960
Panik i paradis – 1960
Den hvide hingst – 1961
Landsbylægen – 1961
Løgn og løvebrøl – 1961
Poeten og Lillemor i forårshumør – 1961
Landmandsliv – 1965
Martha – 1967
Brødrene på Uglegården – 1967
Min søsters børn vælter byen – 1968
De røde heste – 1968
Mig og min lillebror og Bølle – 1969
Ballade på Christianshavn – 1971
Far til fire i højt humør – 1971
Da Svante forsvandt – 1975
Olsen-banden på sporet – 1975
Den ubetænksomme elsker – 1982

External links

 at Danskefilm.dk

Danish male stage actors
Danish male film actors
1906 births
1982 deaths
People from Nyborg
20th-century Danish male actors